The 2012 Campeonato Roraimense was the 18th season of Roraima's top professional football league. The competition began 31 March and ended 9 June. Associação Esportiva Real was the defending champion

Format
The six clubs played two single round robin tournaments. The group winners qualified for the final. The winner of both tournaments played for the state championship. If the same team won both tournament, they would have been automatically declared the champion. All games were played in Ribeirão, Boa Vista.

Qualifications
The champion qualified for 2013 Copa do Brasil.

Participating teams

First tournament

Second tournament

Finals

Overall standings

References

2012 Roraima on www.rsssfbrasil.com

External links
 http://www.futeboldonorte.com/ 

Ror
Campeonato Roraimense